The second and final season of the American musical drama television series Smash premiered on February 5, 2013, on NBC and consisted of 17 episodes. On March 13, 2013, NBC announced they were moving the remaining season two episodes of Smash to Saturday nights at 9:00PM EST starting April 6 in order to play the full 17-episode order. The two-hour series finale aired on May 26, 2013, moving the show to a special Sunday slot.

Production
On March 22, 2012, NBC renewed Smash for a second season. Gossip Girl'''s Joshua Safran replaced creator Theresa Rebeck as showrunner, since Rebeck departed to focus on other projects. Rebeck did not return to the show in any capacity. However, she remained credited as executive producer.

Not returning to the cast from the previous season were Jaime Cepero (Ellis), Raza Jaffrey (Dev), Brian d'Arcy James (Frank), and recurring cast member Will Chase (Michael), although James did make guest appearances in the first episode of season 2 and the series finale.Smash Series Finale: And the Tony Goes to... Retrieved May 27, 2013 Jeremy Jordan joined the series in the role of Jimmy. Academy Award winner Jennifer Hudson had a recurring role as Veronica Moore, a Tony award-winning actress who affects the lives of Karen and Ivy. Jesse L. Martin was cast in a six-episode arc as Scott Nichols, the Manhattan Theatre Workshop's artistic director, whose story affected most of the cast.

New Smash show runner/executive producer Josh Safran noted about the show's movement to Saturdays starting April 6 meant NBC was choosing to cancel the series, Safran said he was "saddened" and surprised by the move, "We're all aware the show is not successful, but I guess I had hoped we would see what happened when The Voice came back [or] maybe they'd move us to a better time slot. But I understand from the network's point of view. We hit a number and we stuck there." Safran said of the final episodes would be constructed as a series finale, "I don't want [viewers] to think they are going to be left hanging, because they won't be," he assures. "The season has a beginning, middle and an end... [And] it just gets better and better." Safran also said he and the other producers were still proud of the series. The two hour series finale aired on May 26, 2013.Smash's second season is a production of Universal Television in association with DreamWorks. The series has a large number of executive producers including Steven Spielberg, Craig Zadan, Neil Meron, Rebeck, Darryl Frank and Justin Falvey. Marc Shaiman and Scott Wittman serve as the composers and executive producers.

Cast and characters

Regular
 Debra Messing as Julia Houston, a successful Broadway lyricist and the musical's co-writer. She is married with a son, but had an affair with Michael Swift, who played Joe DiMaggio in the initial Marilyn workshop. Houston is based on creator Theresa Rebeck.
 Jack Davenport as Derek Wills, the director of the musical, who will stop at nothing to make the show a success. He has an on-and-off relationship with Marilyn workshop star Ivy Lynn, though he has also shown interest in Karen Cartwright and had a physical relationship with Rebecca Duvall during the Boston preview before she left the show.
 Katharine McPhee as Karen Cartwright, an ingenue from Iowa, who lands a successful audition and becomes a serious contender for the role of Monroe. Somewhat new to show business, her naiveté is generally scorned by her peers, though her talent is rarely called into question. She played Marilyn for the Boston preview, when Rebecca Duvall left.
 Christian Borle as Tom Levitt, a theatrical composer and Julia's longtime songwriting partner. He and Derek Wills have an acrimonious relationship stemming from a business fallout 11 years ago. Tom briefly dates a Republican lawyer but later becomes attracted to Sam Strickland, a dancer in the ensemble of Bombshell.
 Megan Hilty as Ivy Lynn, a seasoned performer who, at the beginning of the series, is working in the ensemble of Heaven On Earth, another Broadway musical that Tom and Julia wrote. Ivy is favored by nearly everyone on board with the production to play Marilyn Monroe, but after the workshop flops, she is replaced by a big movie star. Throughout the show, she's in an on-and-off relationship with the Bombshell director Derek Wills and finds herself constantly competing with Karen in many different situations, eventually losing the role of Marilyn to her for the Boston preview.
 Anjelica Huston as Eileen Rand, the musical's tenacious producer, who is dealing with divorce proceedings from her husband, Jerry, which could threaten the musical and forces her to think outside the box in securing funds for the show.  A running gag throughout the series is Eileen throwing drinks into Jerry's face.
 Leslie Odom Jr. as Sam Strickland, an ensemble member, a good friend of Ivy who is gay and very much into sports. Due to their mutual friendship with Ivy, he forms a connection with Tom.
 Jeremy Jordan as Jimmy Collins, a working-class man from Brooklyn who is on the brink of self-destruction.
 Andy Mientus as Kyle Bishop, a poor kid from Brooklyn with dreams of writing for Broadway.
 Krysta Rodriguez as Ana Vargas, Karen's new roommate who is looking for her big break.

Recurring
 Ann Harada as Linda, the stage manager of the musical.
 Becky Ann Baker as Karen's mother.
 Dylan Baker as Roger Cartwright, Karen's father.
 Michael Cristofer as Jerry Rand, Eileen's soon-to-be ex-husband and former producing partner.
 Wesley Taylor as Bobby, an ensemble member who is not afraid to say what is on his mind. He is a friend of Ivy and later, Karen.
 Savannah Wise as Jessica, an ensemble member and friend of Ivy and later, Karen.
 Jenny Laroche as Sue, an ensemble member and friend of Ivy and later, Karen.
 Thorsten Kaye as Nick Felder, Eileen's boyfriend who is sent to jail early in the season.
 Daniel Sunjata as Peter, a dramaturg (script doctor), who is brought in to help Julia iron out problems with the Bombshell script.
 Nikki Blonsky as Margot, Jerry Rand's assistant.
 Daphne Rubin-Vega as Agnes, Bombshell's publicist.
 Emory Cohen as Leo, Julia's son
 Brian d'Arcy James as Frank, Julia's husband.
 Mara Davi as Daisy Parker

Special guest stars
 Jennifer Hudson as Veronica Moore, a Tony Award-winning Broadway star who has had to pay a price to reach her Broadway dream.
 Sean Hayes as Terrence "Terry" Falls, a comedic television and film star who is making his Broadway debut in the musical Liaisons, based on Les liaisons dangereuses.
 Luke Macfarlane as Patrick Dillon
 Liza Minnelli as herself.
 Bernadette Peters as Leigh Conroy. Reprising her Season 1 role, as Ivy's mother.
 Jesse L. Martin as Scott Nichols, artistic director of the Manhattan Theatre Workshop, Julia's new love interest.
 Jamey Sheridan as Richard Francis, an editor at the New York Times, Eileen's new love interest.
 Rosie O'Donnell as herself.
 Lin-Manuel Miranda as himself.

Cameos
 Brenda Braxton, Tony-nominated actress
 Jordan Roth, President of Jujamcyn Theatres
 Michael Riedel, theatre columnist for the New York Post
 Harvey Fierstein, Broadway theatre/film actor/writer
 Annaleigh Ashford, Broadway actress
 Brynn O'Malley, Broadway actress
 Mara Davi, Broadway actress
 Margo Martindale, acclaimed Broadway actress
 Bernie Telsey, famed Broadway casting director ("The Dramaturg")
 Matt Bogart, Broadway actor of Jersey Boys ("The Dramaturg")
 Tom Galantich, Broadway actor ("The Dramaturg")
 Jon Robin Baitz, acclaimed playwright ("The Read-Through")
 Kathy Fitzgerald, Broadway actress of The Producers and 9 to 5: The Musical ("Musical Chairs")
 Seth Rudetsky, Broadway radio host and Playbill.com video blogger ("Musical Chairs")
 Edward Hibbert, Broadway and television actor ("Opening Night")
 Donna McKechnie, Tony Award-winning actress, dancer, and choreographer ("Opening Night")
 Scott Wittman, Broadway and television composer (and "Smash" composer) ("Opening Night")
 Marc Shaiman, Broadway and television composer (and "Smash" composer) ("Opening Night")
 Kathie Lee Gifford, host of NBC's Today Show ("The Producers")
 Frank DiLella, producer and reporter for On Stage ("The Phenomenon")
 Lindsay Mendez, Broadway actress of Godspell, Dogfight and Wicked ("The Transfer")
 Lin-Manuel Miranda, Broadway actor and composer of In the Heights and Bring it On ("The Transfer")
 Michael Musto, former editor of The Village Voice (The Nominations")
 Mary Testa, Broadway actress of 42nd Street and Xanadu ("The Nominations")
 Dee Hoty, Broadway actress of City of Angels, The Will Rogers Follies and Mamma Mia! ("The Nominations")
 Cheyenne Jackson, Broadway actor of All Shook Up and Xanadu ("The Nominations")
 Christine Ebersole, two time Tony winner and Broadway actress of 42nd Street and Grey Gardens ("The Nominations")
 Lillias White, Broadway actress of How to Succeed, Chicago and Fela! ("The Tonys")
 Ron Rifkin, Broadway actor of Cabaret  ("The Tonys")
 Kathleen Marshall, Tony-nominated director/choreographer for Wonderful Town, The Pajama Game, and Anything Goes ("The Tonys")
 Marin Mazzie, Broadway actress of Kiss Me, Kate and Next to Normal ("The Tonys")
 Susan Blackwell, Broadway.com video blogger and Broadway actress of title of show ("The Tonys")

Episodes

References

External links 
 
 

Smash (TV series)
2013 American television seasons